Sky Srpska was a planned airline in the Republic of Srpska, Bosnia and Herzegovina. The airline was a public enterprise owned by the entity government and had its hub at the Banja Luka International Airport. The airline launched international services in July 2010 after signing a cooperation agreement with Adria Airways, selling seats for flights from Banja Luka to Ljubljana. The Republic of Srpska government delayed the launch of the airline on several occasions, but ultimately decided to end its support in 2012 due to the airlines lack of funds to lease an aircraft.

References

External links
Sky Srpska Homepage
Sky Srpska logo
Evropa više nije daleko

Defunct airlines of Bosnia and Herzegovina
Airlines established in 2007
Airlines disestablished in 2011
2007 establishments in Bosnia and Herzegovina
Transport in Republika Srpska